American singer Jack White has released five studio albums, six live albums, one compilation album, and 20 singles. Prior to releasing solo records, White recorded albums with several bands, including the White Stripes, the Raconteurs, and the Dead Weather. Throughout his career, he has also produced the works of many other artists and made guest appearances on albums.

Albums

Studio albums

Live albums

Compilation albums

Singles

As lead artist

As featured artist

Other charting songs

Production history

White has been the main or sole producer on all of his own work, as well as that of other bands, particularly those on his Third Man Records label. This is a list of his production credits of notable acts outside of his solo career.

Singles

Albums and EPs

Soundtrack appearances
Cold Mountain (2003) – "Wayfaring Stranger", "Sittin' on Top of the World", "Never Far Away", "Christmas Time Will Soon Be Over", "Great High Mountain"
Napoleon Dynamite (2004) – "We're Going to Be Friends"
Quantum of Solace (2008) – "Another Way to Die" (with Alicia Keys)
Shine a Light (2008) – "Loving Cup" (with The Rolling Stones)
It Might Get Loud (2009) – "Fly Farm Blues"
The Great Gatsby (2013) – "Love Is Blindness"
The Hateful Eight (2015) – "Apple Blossom"
Music from The American Epic Sessions: Original Motion Picture Soundtrack (2017) – “On The Road Again” (with Nas), “2 Fingers of Whiskey” (with Elton John), “Matrimonial Intentions”, “One Mic” (with Nas), “Mama’s Angel Child”

Album appearances
Fire by Electric Six (2003) – "Danger! High Voltage" (credited as "John S. O'Leary")
Rome by Danger Mouse and Daniele Luppi (2011) – "The Rose with the Broken Neck", "Two Against One" and "The World"
The Lost Notebooks of Hank Williams by various artists (2011) – "You Know That I Know"
AHK-toong BAY-bi Covered by various artists (2011) – "Love Is Blindness"
Lemonade by Beyoncé (2016) – "Don't Hurt Yourself"
We Got It from Here... Thank You 4 Your Service by A Tribe Called Quest (2016) – "Solid Wall of Sound", "Ego" and "The Donald"
Igor by Tyler, The Creator (2019) – "Are We Still Friends?"

Notes

References

Discographies of American artists
Rock music discographies